The Texas Facilities Commission is a Texas state agency.

TFC's main duty is to manage state government buildings (excluding those operated by universities, the Texas State Capitol, and the Governor's Mansion).  TFC also handles the sale of surplus property and manages the Federal Surplus Program on behalf of the State and qualified local and non-profit agencies.

The TFC was originally established in 1919 as the State Board of Control, which mandated consolidation of the State’s purchasing, printing, and property management functions. The State Purchasing and General Services Commission replaced the State Board of Control in September 1979. The agency’s name was changed again in 1991 to the General Services Commission. The General Services Commission (GSC), the TBPC’s immediate predecessor, was abolished in 2001 by the 77th Legislature.

TFC has its headquarters in the Central Services Building in Austin.

References

External links

 Texas Facilities Commission

State agencies of Texas